Mehmet Tekin Arıburun (3 October 1903 – 13 October 1993) was a Turkish soldier and statesman. He was born in then-Ottoman territory of Ishtib, Kosovo Vilayet (today Štip, part of the Republic of Macedonia). He was the last (Acting) President to be born outside the territory of present-day Turkey.

His father is Hüseyin Avni who was the commander of  57th Regiment in Gallipoli Campaign in 1915 during World War I. Hüseyin Avni Bey died in action in Arıburnu. 

After Surname Law (Turkey) of 1935, Mustafa Kemal Atatürk requested that he should take Arıburun as his surname to honour his late father.
  
He graduated from the Turkish Military College in 1925. He was sent to United Kingdom in 1929 to attend flying courses. In 1935 he graduated from Turkish Military Academy. He became a Army general in 1959. He held the office of Chief Commander of Turkish Air Force. After 1960 Turkish coup d'état he was forced into early retirement by the Junta. He started his political life and elected as senator in 1961. He became the chairman of Senate between 19 November 1970 and 14 June 1977.

He was the acting president of Turkey between 28 March 1973, and 6 April 1973, after Cevdet Sunay completed his seven-year term, until the election of Fahri Korutürk.

General Arıburun was a polyglot; he spoke English, German, French and Italian.

He represented Turkey in many international meetings and conferences.

References

|-

1903 births
1993 deaths
20th-century presidents of Turkey
People from Štip
People from Kosovo vilayet
Macedonian Turks
Acting presidents of Turkey
Members of the Senate of the Republic (Turkey)
Turkish Military Academy alumni
Army War College (Turkey) alumni
Turkish Army generals
Turkish Air Force generals
Commanders of the Turkish Air Force